Artesian is an unincorporated community in Bremer County, in the U.S. state of Iowa.

History
St. Paul's Lutheran Church in Artesian was established in 1871. The Moeller General Store in Artesian was founded in 1900 by Fred F. Moeller and was torn down in the 1980s due to a shoulder-widening project on US Highway 63.

The community's population was 13 in 1900, and 10 in 1920.

References

Unincorporated communities in Bremer County, Iowa
Unincorporated communities in Iowa